Arkharavia (meaning "Arkhara road") is a dubious genus of somphospondylan sauropod, but at least some of the remains probably belong to a hadrosaurid. It lived in what is now Russia, during the Late Cretaceous. It was described in 2010 by Alifanov and Bolotsky.  The type species is A. heterocoelica.

Description
The holotype material consists of a single anterior caudal vertebra. Also, a tooth and a few proximal tail vertebrae (from near the base of the tail) were originally described as belonging to this species, but these probably belong to an indeterminate hadrosaur. The vertebrae are unusual in being weakly heterocoelous, which means that the centrum or body of a vertebra has saddle-shaped surfaces where it meets the vertebrae in front or behind it.

Classification
Arkharavia was originally classified as a titanosauriform sauropod, thought to be related to Chubutisaurus, a sauropod from the Cretaceous of Argentina. However, further study showed that the referred vertebra in fact belonged to a hadrosaurid. The holotype vertebra is currently considered an indeterminate somphospondylan.

Contemporaries
Arkharavia lived in the Amur Region, which was a 'hot spot' for dinosaurs in Russia. Other dinosaurs from the area include the lambeosaurines (hollow-crested duckbills) Amurosaurus, Olorotitan, and Charonosaurus, and the saurolophine (duckbills without hollow crests) Kerberosaurus and Wulagasaurus.

See also

 2010 in paleontology

References

Macronarians
Late Cretaceous dinosaurs of Asia
Fossil taxa described in 2010
Nomina dubia